Blyth's leaf warbler (Phylloscopus reguloides) is a species of leaf warbler (family Phylloscopidae). It was formerly included in the "Old World warbler" assemblage.

It is found mainly in Southeast Asia, southern China and along the Himalayas till northern Pakistan. Its natural habitat is subtropical or tropical moist montane forests.

This bird was named after the English zoologist Edward Blyth.

References

Blyth's leaf warbler
Birds of the Himalayas
Birds of Tibet
Birds of Yunnan
Birds of Southeast Asia
Blyth's leaf warbler
Blyth's leaf warbler
Taxonomy articles created by Polbot